Lawrence Joel "Larry" Block (October 30, 1942 – October 7, 2012) was an American stage, film, television, and radio actor.

Early life and education
Lawrence Joel Block was born in New York City, New York, the son of Sonia (née Kutcher), a travel agent, and Harold Block, who worked in the garment industry. He had a brother, Kenneth.

In 1964, he graduated with a B.A. in English from the University of Rhode Island College of Arts and Sciences.

Personal life and death
Block married Jolly King on September 21, 1981. They had two children, Zachary and Zoe.

He died in New York City, New York on October 7, 2012, three weeks before his 70th birthday.

Filmography

Films

Shamus (1973) - Springy
Slap Shot (1977) - Peterboro Referee
Heaven Can Wait (1978) - Peters
Hardcore (1979) - Detective Burrows
First Family (1980) - Gloria's Secret Service Agent #1
After Hours (1985) - Taxi Driver
Cocktail (1988) - Bar Owner
Robots (1988; direct-to-video) - Julius Enderby
High Stakes (1989) - Harvey
Betsy's Wedding (1990) - Barber
My Blue Heaven (1990) - Defense Attorney
Big Night (1996) - Man in Restaurant
Dangerous Proposition (1998) - Dr. Butler
Isn't She Great (2000) - Herbie
Bait (2000) - Customer
Don't Say a Word (2001) - Doorman
Garmento (2002) - Store Manager
Book of Danny (2002) - Harry
Live at Five (2005; short film) - Chef Buddy
Stealing Martin Lane (2005) - Nigel
The Guitar (2008) - Mr. Faddis
Triptosane (2010) - Dr. Ken 'Mecca' Rennet
Friends and Strangers (2011; short film) - Grandpa

Television

The Secret Storm (1954) - Mickey (1971)
General Hospital (1963) - Cal Jamison (1978)
Sesame Street (1971-1972) - Tom
Kojak (1973) - Gerry Erskine
A Matter of Wife... and Death (1975) - Springy
Baretta (1975) - Chemist
The Lindbergh Kidnapping Case (1976; TV film) - Barney Fayne
Ellery Queen (1976) - Floor Director
Police Story (1977) - Carl Cusick
Delvecchio (1977) - Liquor Store Clerk
Rosetti and Ryan (1977) - Harry
M*A*S*H (1977-1978) - Cimoli / Eddie Hendrix
Charlie's Angels (1978) - Arlo Spinner
Operation Petticoat (1978) - Bartender
Space Force (1978; TV pilot) - Private Arnold Fleck
Barney Miller (1978, episode: Evaluation) - Russell Schuman
CHiPs (1979) - Abel
The Last Ride of the Dalton Gang (1979; TV film) - Leroy Keenan
Ryan's Hope (1981) - Stan Feller
Miami Vice (1987) - FBI Agent
Tattingers (1988) - Clerk
Dead Man Out (1989; TV film) - Kleinfeld
Family Matters (1989) - Mr. Seeger
Murphy Brown (1990) - Al Henderson
Law & Order (1991-2002) - Darryl Moffatt / Stan / Slater / Feldman
New York Undercover (1996) - Rossmore
Third Watch (2000) - Helmut Kaiser
The Job (2001) - Dr. Kline
Law & Order: Special Victims Unit (2001) - Lonnie
Law & Order: Criminal Intent (2003) - Frank Kastner
Smash (2012) - Gary Garrison (final appearance)

Radio

Block appeared frequently on Joe Frank's radio shows

References

External links
 

1942 births
2012 deaths
20th-century American male actors
21st-century American male actors
American male film actors
American male stage actors
American male television actors
Male actors from New York City
University of Rhode Island alumni